is a Japanese athlete specialising in the javelin throw. He represented his country at the 2015 World Championships finishing ninth. In addition, he won the silver at the 2014 Asian Games.

His personal best in the event is 86.83 metres set in Isahaya in 2014.

Competition record

Seasonal bests by year
2011 – 78.21
2012 – 78.00
2013 – 78.19
2014 – 86.83
2015 – 84.66
2016 – 84.54
2017 – 82.13
2018 – 80.83
2019 – 82.03

References

1991 births
Living people
Sportspeople from Saitama Prefecture
Japanese male javelin throwers
Olympic male javelin throwers
Olympic athletes of Japan
Athletes (track and field) at the 2016 Summer Olympics
Asian Games silver medalists for Japan
Asian Games medalists in athletics (track and field)
Athletes (track and field) at the 2014 Asian Games
Athletes (track and field) at the 2018 Asian Games
Medalists at the 2014 Asian Games
Competitors at the 2013 Summer Universiade
World Athletics Championships athletes for Japan
Japan Championships in Athletics winners
21st-century Japanese people